Shabab Oman II is a full-rigged ship which entered service with the Royal Navy of Oman in August 2014, replacing the current ship of the same name. She is a full-rigged ship which was built in Romania, fitted out in the Netherlands and launched in 2013.

Description

History

Shabab Oman II was designed by Dykstra Naval Architects, Amsterdam, Netherlands. Her keel was laid in March 2013. She was built by Damen Shipyards, Galaţi, Romania and launched on 2 December 2013. The IMO Number 9662715 was allocated. In January 2014, she was towed to Damen Schelde Naval Shipbuilding, Vlissingen, Netherlands for fitting out, including the fitting of her masts, the tallest of which will measure . She entered service with the Royal Navy of Oman in August 2014. Shabab Oman II replaced the previous  after entering service.

Voyages
Her first long voyage was the crossing of the Mediterranean Sea, the Red Sea, the Arabian Sea and the Sea of Oman to reach Muscat, the Omani capital.

During her fourth voyage from 15 April to August 2019, Shabab Oman II visited 17 ports in 12 countries and had some 211,000 visitors aboard most of them during her participation in the Armada Festival in the port of Rouen, France, 6–16 June 2019.

She participated in Kiel Week and the 2022 Tall Ships Races in the Black Sea on her sixth international voyage, visiting a number of European countries and earning honors as the vessel travelling the furthest distance to participate in the festival.

References

2013 ships
Ships built in the Netherlands
Ships built in Romania
Full-rigged ships
Naval ships of Oman
Individual sailing vessels